Ian Cooper may refer to:

Ian Cooper (Australian footballer, born 1946), former Australian rules football player
Ian Cooper (Australian footballer, born 1954), former Australian rules footballer
Ian Cooper (English footballer) (born 1946), former English football (soccer) player
Ian Cooper (ice hockey) (born 1968), British ice hockey player
Ian Cooper (violinist) (born 1970), Australian musician
Ian Cooper (boxer), ABA Middleweight Champion